Hurston Warren is a  biological Site of Special Scientific Interest south-east of Pulborough in West Sussex.

This site has a variety of habitats, including wet and dry heath, bogs, woodland and open water. One of the bogs is a quaking bog, where a floating raft of vegetation covers open water or fluid peat; it has flora such as round-leaved sundew, bog asphodel, hare's-tail cottongrass and cranberry. A golf course occupies much of the heath.

References

Sites of Special Scientific Interest in West Sussex